A Kenny Lattimore Christmas is the eighth studio album by American singer Kenny Lattimore. It was released by Sincere Soul Records and Motown Gospel on October 21, 2016. His first Christmas album, A Kenny Lattimore Christmas reached number 37 on the US Top R&B/Hip-Hop Albums chart.

Track listing

Charts

References 

2016 Christmas albums
Kenny Lattimore albums